Fenn Washland is a 4.9 hectare Local Nature Reserve in South Woodham Ferrers in Essex, England. It is owned by Essex County Council and managed by the Council as a part of the nearby Marsh Farm Country Park.

The site is undeveloped wetland in a valley surrounded by housing. It has grassland, swamp, scrub, ponds and reedbed, providing diverse habitats for wildlife.

There is access to a footpath round the site from Inchbonnie Road, but no formal paths within the site itself.

References

Local Nature Reserves in Essex
South Woodham Ferrers